Michael J P Howard (born 24 December 1928) is a British fencer. He won a silver medal in the team épée event at the 1960 Summer Olympics. He represented England and won a gold medal in the épée, team and a silver medal on the épée, individual at the 1958 British Empire and Commonwealth Games in Cardiff, Wales. Four years later he won another gold medal in the épée, team at the 1962 British Empire and Commonwealth Games in Perth, Western Australia.

References

External links
 
 "Cotswold's Sportsman Lived His Olympic Dream," Gloucestshire Echo, April 10, 2012

1928 births
Living people
British male fencers
Olympic fencers of Great Britain
Fencers at the 1956 Summer Olympics
Fencers at the 1960 Summer Olympics
Fencers at the 1964 Summer Olympics
Olympic silver medallists for Great Britain
Olympic medalists in fencing
People from Richmond, London
Medalists at the 1960 Summer Olympics
Commonwealth Games medallists in fencing
Commonwealth Games gold medallists for England
Commonwealth Games silver medallists for England
Fencers at the 1958 British Empire and Commonwealth Games
Fencers at the 1962 British Empire and Commonwealth Games
English Olympic medallists
20th-century British people
Medallists at the 1958 British Empire and Commonwealth Games
Medallists at the 1962 British Empire and Commonwealth Games